Youth for a United World (Y4UW) (formerly Young People for a United World or YPUW (Giovani Per Un Mondo Unito) is a group of young people of different races, cultures and beliefs committed to living for a United World. Y4UW was first launched in 1985 at a Focolare youth event known as a Genfest. The group was founded by Chiara Lubich of the Focolare Movement. Since 1996 the Y4UW have organised an annual worldwide event known as United World Week (formerly known as World Unity Week). The 2007 World Unity Week took place between October 14 and 21.

After a period of quiescence, the movement renewed its activities in 2011 after John Paul II's beatification.

Notes and references

External links

Y4UW: who we are

Youth religious organizations
Youth organisations based in Italy
Catholic student organizations